A Deadly Secret, also translated as Requiem of Ling Sing and Secret of the Linked Cities, is a wuxia novel by Jin Yong (Louis Cha). It was first published in the magazine Southeast Asia Weekly and the Hong Kong newspaper Ming Pao in 1963. Its original Chinese title was Su Xin Jian before Jin Yong changed it to Lian Cheng Jue. The story revolves around the adventures of the protagonist Di Yun, an ordinary young peasant, who is imprisoned after being framed. In his quest for vengeance, he accidentally acquires the Liancheng Swordplay manual, an ancient artifact not only prized for the skills detailed inside, but also for containing a secret leading to a treasure.

Plot
The plot follows the experiences of the protagonist, Di Yun, a young peasant from Xiangxi. He grew up in the countryside with his martial arts master, Qi Zhangfa, and Qi's daughter, Qi Fang, who is also his childhood sweetheart. One day, the three of them travel to the city to attend the birthday party of Wan Zhenshan, Qi Zhangfa's senior from the same martial arts school. During the trip, Di Yun is arrested and imprisoned after he is framed for larceny and attempted rape.

Qi Zhangfa disappears mysteriously when Di Yun needs his help. Wan Zhenshan's son, Wan Gui, bribes the magistrate to dish out a heavy sentence to Di Yun to exaggerate the seriousness of his "crimes". At the same time, in order to win Qi Fang's affection, Wan Gui hypocritically plays the role of a good man by pretending to speak up for Di Yun in court. Qi Fang becomes disappointed with Di Yun after believing that he is indeed guilty and gives up on him. With no one else to turn to, she eventually marries Wan Gui.

Di Yun suffers in prison, where he is constantly harassed by Ding Dian, a fellow raving inmate who accuses him of being a spy. However, after Di Yun attempts suicide, Ding Dian is convinced that he is not a spy and befriends him. Ding Dian then tells Di Yun how he obtained the Liancheng Swordplay manual from a swordsman, Mei Niansheng, and how he became a target of many martial artists who are seeking the manual. Ding Dian also teaches Di Yun a powerful inner energy skill, which later proves to be a blessing to him. Di Yun also hears from Ding Dian the dirty secrets of Qi Zhangfa and Wan Zhenshan – of how they murdered their master, Mei Niansheng, in their attempt to seize the Liancheng Swordplay manual.

Di Yun and Ding Dian manage to break out from prison, but Ding dies after being fatally poisoned by Ling Tuisi, a heartless magistrate who is also the father of Ding Dian's deceased lover. Di Yun goes to find Qi Fang and sees that she and Wan Gui now have a daughter called "Kongxincai", which was also his childhood nickname. Feeling emotionally hurt, he leaves and arrives at a temple, where he encounters an evil cannibalistic monk, Baoxiang, whom he outwits and kills. After he dons Baoxiang's robes, he is mistaken by the Blood Saber School's lascivious leader, Grandmaster Xuedao, for a grand-apprentice. Xuedao protects Di Yun from attacks by self-proclaimed orthodox martial arts schools, captures a maiden Shui Sheng, and holds her hostage while they flee from the attackers.

They encounter an avalanche that causes them to be trapped in a snowy valley in the Daxue Mountains. Xuedao manages to kill three of their pursuers, one of whom is Shui Sheng's father. Meanwhile, Xuedao becomes increasingly suspicious of Di Yun's identity and attempts to kill Di Yun when he realises that Di Yun is not really his grand-apprentice. Unexpectedly, Xuedao's strike helps Di Yun complete his inner energy cycle; Di Yun turns the tables on Xuedao and kills him. The last surviving pursuer, Hua Tiegan, reveals his true colours after Xuedao's death and feeds on the dead bodies of his three companions to survive. While Di Yun, Shui Sheng and Hua Tiegan remain in the valley to wait for the snow to melt, Shui Sheng sees Di Yun's kindness beneath his seeming misanthropy. When the three of them are finally able to leave the valley and meet up with other martial artists, Hua Tiegan accuses Di Yun and Shui Sheng of sexual immorality in front of Shui Sheng's fiancé. Di Yun separates himself from Shui Sheng and continues on his lonely quest for vengeance.

Di Yun tracks down the perpetrators responsible for his wrongful incarceration and learns that his respected master, Qi Zhangfa, is actually a scheming and ruthless villain – just like what Ding Dian had told him. Qi Fang is mercilessly killed by her husband, Wan Gui, when he suspects her of infidelity. As the story progresses, all the antagonists eventually locate the whereabouts of the Liancheng Swordplay manual in a temple, where they start fighting over the treasure. They become insane after coming into contact with the deadly venom smeared on the jewels.

After witnessing these beastly acts, especially Qi Fang's death, Di Yun becomes totally disillusioned with the dark nature and greed of humanity. He brings Qi Fang's daughter, Kongxincai, with him to the snowy valley and intends to lead a reclusive life there. To his surprise, he meets Shui Sheng, who has been faithfully waiting alone for his return.

Characters

Timeframe and literary precedent
The novel's historical setting is not explicitly mentioned. However, some readers speculate that the story is based in the Qing dynasty, judging from the illustrations in the published Chinese versions authorised by Jin Yong, which show male characters wearing queues.

Wu Liuqi, a character from The Deer and the Cauldron, is mentioned in the third edition of A Deadly Secret. This confirms that A Deadly Secret is set in the Qing dynasty.

Some commentators feel that the plot resembles Alexandre Dumas' The Count of Monte Cristo, except that they are based in different countries and historical periods. Jin Yong has admitted some influence from Dumas, his favourite non-Chinese novelist.

Adaptations

Films

Television

Radio
In 1981, Hong Kong's RTHK produced a 25 episodes radio drama based on the novel and the intro song performed by Adam Cheng.

References

 
1963 novels
Novels by Jin Yong
Novels first published in serial form
Works originally published in Ming Pao
Novels about orphans
Novels set in Imperial China
Chinese novels adapted into television series
Wrongful convictions in fiction
Fiction about prison escapes